Lubna Suliman al-Olayan (born 4 August 1955) is a Saudi business woman and former CEO and Deputy Chairman of Olayan Financing Company.

Career
She has been on the boards of WPP and Saudi Hollandi Bank (now Alawwal Bank), as well as the International Advisory Boards of Rolls-Royce and Citigroup.

Olayan was the Chief Executive Officer of the Olayan Financing Company, and (OFC), the holding entity for the Olayan Group's operations in the Kingdom of Saudi Arabia and the Middle East until May 1st 2019, when she was replaced by Jonathan Franklin. She is on the board of the group along with her brother Khaled and sisters Hayat and Hutham. It is thought that the private family has accumulated a fortune that tops $10 billion. The group was founded in 1947 by her father, the late entrepreneur Sulaiman S. Olayan, The Olayan Group is a private multinational enterprise engaged in distribution, manufacturing, services and investments. OFC operates or actively participates in more than 40 companies, often in partnership with leading multinationals. OFC is also one of the largest investors in the Saudi and regional stock markets. In April 2019, Olayan announced her retirement as CEO of Olayan Financing Company.

On 16 June 2019, Olayan was named Chairwoman of the Saudi British Bank (SABB), making her the first Saudi woman to head a bank. She was reappointed in January 2020 to serve a three year term, and assumed to hold to the position after the merger between SABB and Alawwal Bank.

Other activities
Olayan joined the Board of Directors of INSEAD in December 2005, and has been a member of its International Council since March 1997. In April 2007, she was elected as a member of the Board of Trustees for Cornell University. Olayan also joined the Advisory Board of Effat College, a private and non-profit girls college in Jeddah, Saudi Arabia, in April 2006. She is also a board member at Alfanar. She has been on the Board of Trustees of the "Arab Thought Foundation" since January 2002. Olayan was elected to the Board of the Down Syndrome Charitable Association in June 2005, a not-for-profit organization based in Riyadh. She was also appointed to the Board of Trustees of King Abdullah University for Science and Technology (KAUST). In June 2018, she was elected as a member of the MIT Corporation. In 2010, she was awarded the Cornell Entrepreneur of the Year. As of 2014, she is listed as the 86th most powerful woman in the world by Forbes.

Personal life
She is married to John Xefos, an international attorney from the United States, and they have three daughters all residing in Riyadh, Saudi Arabia. She is the daughter of Saudi billionaire businessman Sulaiman Olayan.

References

External links
Lubna Olayan, Bio, Arab Bankers Association of North America
Mrs. Lubna S. Olayan, Bios, Board of Trustees, King Abdullah University of Science and Technology
Alfanar, The first venture philanthropy organization focussing on the Arab Region
Interview in the Arab News 
 "A Saudi Vision for Growth" - 2004 speech at the Jeddah Economic Forum 

Lubna
Lubna
Lubna
1955 births
Lubna
Living people
Lubna
Lubna
Lubna
Lubna
Lubna
Lubna
Lubna